[[File:Bavakabar.jpg|thumb|Tomb of H.H Baselios Marthoma Mathews II
Malankara Metropolitan & Catholicos of Apostolic throne of Saint Thomas]]Mount Horeb Ashram''' is a monastery of the Malankara Orthodox Syrian Church. It is situated in Sasthamkotta near the Sasthamkotta lake. The Ashram was started in 1991. 

The tomb of the  19th Malankara Metropolitan and 6th Catholicos of the Malankara Orthodox Syrian Church, Moran Mar Baselios Mar Thoma Mathews II is in this Ashram.

Notes

References
Official website of Malankara Orthodox Church

Malankara Orthodox Syrian church buildings